Rick Fera (born August 13, 1964) is an  English-Canadian former ice hockey forward.

Playing career
Born in Keswick, Ontario, Canada, Fera spent the majority of his playing career playing in Great Britain, although he played  junior ice hockey in his native Ontario. Fera also is a British citizen, which he achieved during his career. Although not well built, Fera was a speedy skater, who was extremely quick across the ice. Fera also played with high skill, was a deadly accurate shooter, and an extremely unselfish player, his points scoring record shows both these skills. His short partnership (#7 Jersey) with Great Britain Hall Of Famer & All-Star Player Tony Hand (#9 Jersey) at Murrayfield bore an uncanny ability to know where each other were on ice, giving rise to highly productive numbers together.

Career stats

Awards
 1986/87 British Hockey League Champion with Murrayfield Racers
 1986/87 British Hockey League Most Goals with Murrayfield Racers
 1986/87 British Hockey League Most Points with Murrayfield Racers
 1986/87 British Hockey League Best Player with Murrayfield Racers
 1986/87 British Hockey League All star Team.

References

1964 births
Living people
Basingstoke Beavers players
Basingstoke Bison players
British ice hockey players
Canadian ice hockey forwards
Fife Flyers players
Kingston Canadians players
Ice hockey people from Ontario
Murrayfield Racers players
Paisley Pirates players
People from the Regional Municipality of York
Peterborough Petes (ice hockey) players
Sault Ste. Marie Greyhounds players
Solihull Barons players
Canadian expatriate ice hockey players in England
Canadian expatriate ice hockey players in Scotland
Naturalised citizens of the United Kingdom